Ultrajapyx is a genus of diplurans in the family Japygidae.

Species
 Ultrajapyx pieltaini (Silvestri, 1929)

References

Diplura